The Koester Block Historic District is a historic district which was listed on the National Register of Historic Places in 1980.

The  listed area included five contributing buildings.

It includes the Charles Koester House, which is separately listed on the National Register, and was the home of Charles F. Koestler.  The district also includes the Charles J. D. Koester House and three commercial buildings.

References

Historic districts on the National Register of Historic Places in Kansas
Marshall County, Kansas